Elections of members of West Suffolk District Council are held every four years, following the merger of Forest Heath district council and the Borough of St Edmundsbury to form the new West Suffolk district in April 2019. 64 councillors are elected to the chamber, with 34 wards each electing either one, two or three representatives. The first elections to West Suffolk District Council were held on 2 May 2019.

Political control

Leadership
During the shadow period leading up to the council's creation in 2019, the shadow authority was led by James Waters, leader of the outgoing Forest Heath District Council. He was unsuccessful in securing a seat on the new council at its first elections in May 2019. The leader of the council from West Suffolk's first meeting after coming into force in 2019 has been John Griffiths, who was the last leader of St Edmundsbury Borough Council.

Council elections
2019 West Suffolk District Council election

By-election results

2019-present

References

 
Council elections in Suffolk
District council elections in England